V. M. Johnson, also known as Viola Johnson, born in 1950, is a leatherwoman, leather activist and author.

Life
Johnson claims that when she was seventeen years old a vampire gave her some of his own blood to drink and thus she became a vampire.

In the early 1970s, she joined the BDSM and leather scenes. In 1988, she became an honorary member of Tulsa Uniform Leather Seekers Association (T.U.L.S.A). In 2005, she started The Carter/Johnson Library & Collection, a "collection of thousands of books, magazines, posters, art, club and event pins, newspapers, event programs and ephemera showing leather, fetish, S/M erotic history".

She was a judge for many leather-related contests, including Ms. World Leather.

She is on the board of governors for the Leather Hall of Fame.

She was on the board of directors of the Leather Archives & Museum and is a member of the Lesbian Sex Mafia. She is married to Jill Carter.

Notable awards
1995: National Leather Association's Jan Lyon Award for Regional or Local Work
1995: National Leather Association Lifetime Achievement Award
1995: Pantheon of Leather Lifetime Achievement Award (Johnson was the first person to receive the National Leather Association Lifetime Achievement Award and the Pantheon of Leather Lifetime Achievement Award in the same year.)
1998: Pantheon of Leather Couple of the Year award (shared with Jill Carter and Queen Cougar)
2000: Pantheon of Leather Woman of the Year
2005: SouthEast LeatherFest Jack Stice Memorial Community Service Award
2005: Master/slave Conference slave Heart Award
2005: Pantheon of Leather Forebear Award (tied for the win with David S. Kloss)
2007: Black Beat Lifetime Achievement Award (This was the first Lifetime Achievement Award given by Black Beat.)
2012: Master/slave Conference Guy Baldwin Master/slave Heritage Award
2012: National Gay and Lesbian Task Force Leather Leadership Award (Johnson was the first woman to be given this award.)
2018: The Carter/Johnson Library & Collection received the Nonprofit Organization of the Year award as part of the Pantheon of Leather Awards.
Unknown date: Induction into the Society of Janus Hall of Fame

Works
Books
V. M. Johnson, Dhampir: Child of the Blood. Mystic Rose Books, 1995. 
Laura Antoniou (ed.),Some Women. Masquerade Books, Inc, 1995 (contributed "Journal entries")
V. M. Johnson, To Love, to Obey, to Serve: Diary of an Old Guard Slave Mystic Rose Books, 1999. 

Contributing author, notable periodicals
 Black Leather in Color
 Black Mistress Review

References

External links
 The Carter/Johnson Library and Collection

1950 births
African-American writers
American non-fiction writers
BDSM activists
BDSM writers
Leather subculture
American lesbian writers
LGBT African Americans
Living people
Women erotica writers
21st-century African-American people
20th-century African-American people
20th-century American women writers
21st-century American women writers
African-American women writers